Pierre Frédéric Dorian (24 January 1814 in Montbéliard, Doubs – 14 April 1873 in Paris) was a French master blacksmith and radical Republican leader. He served as Minister of Public Works from 4 September 1870 – 19 February 1871. He was the grandfather of Pauline Ménard-Dorian.

References

1814 births
1873 deaths
French blacksmiths
French republicans
People from Montbéliard
Transport ministers of France
Burials at Père Lachaise Cemetery